Lu Xun Museum may refer to:

 Beijing Lu Xun Museum
 Shanghai Lu Xun Museum, in Lu Xun Park
 Shaoxing Lu Xun Museum, at the Lu Xun birthplace